The Virga Jesse Basilica is a basilica, formerly known as the Onze-Lieve-Vrouwekerk, in Hasselt, Belgium. It dates back to the 14th century, approximately 1334. The original chapel was replaced with the current church, which was completed in 1731. Prior to being elevated to the status of a basilica by Pope John Paul II in 1998, it was considered an auxiliary church of the church of St. Quentin, now St. Quentin Cathedral. The church and neighboring houses were heavily damaged by bombing during World War II in 1944. The rebuilt church, now the third church to be built in the same place, was dedicated to the then-bishop of Liège in 1951.

The basilica is best known for the 14th century statue of Virga Jesse, which is paraded through the streets of Hasselt every seven years.

References

Basilica churches in Belgium
Churches in Limburg (Belgium)
Churches completed in 1727
Buildings and structures in Hasselt